Centre Pierre Charbonneau  is a community center located in the Olympic Park in Montreal, Quebec, Canada. It was built in 1957 and its gymnasium holds 2,700 people. The arena also hosted wrestling events at the 1976 Summer Olympics.

It was originally built as a police academy and is located at 3000 rue Viau. All types of courses are given in such areas as gymnastics, martial arts, music, and languages. The center also hosts various conventions and exhibitions during the year. 

It is the former home of the Montreal Jazz of the National Basketball League of Canada. It was formerly host to the Montreal Royal of the American Basketball Association's current incarnation, and the Montreal Sasquatch of the Premier Basketball League.

On December, 27, Thursday, 2007 the arena held a TNA Wrestling House Show. In September 2016, Montreal Roller Derby hosted a 2016 International Women's Flat Track Derby Association Division 1 roller derby playoff tournament at the venue.

See also
 Thin-shell structure
 List of thin shell structures

References

External links 
1976 Summer Olympics official report. Volume 2. pp. 90–3.
Official Website

American Basketball Association (2000–present) venues
Boxing venues in Quebec
Indoor ice hockey venues in Quebec
Indoor arenas in Quebec
Olympic wrestling venues
Mercier–Hochelaga-Maisonneuve
Sports venues in Montreal
Sports venues completed in 1957
Venues of the 1976 Summer Olympics
The Basketball League venues